Se le movió el piso: A portrait of Managua is a documentary film by Anne Aghion about the many layers of destruction that the people in Managua, Nicaragua endured: the 1972 Nicaragua earthquake, four decades of dictatorship and many years of war. Most of the film was centered on the Salazar theater and the many families that lived there. Sofía Montenegro, a journalist and a former Sandinista, was also interviewed as a person who lived and experienced the challenges of the Managuans.

Directed by Anne Aghion and produced by Chaz Productions, this 1996 film won the Coral Award for "Best Non-Latin American Documentary on Latin America" at the Havana Film Festival in Havana, Cuba. Filmed in Managua, the language of Se le movió el piso: A portrait of Managua is Spanish and English with English subtitles.

References

External links
 Official website 
 

1996 films
Nicaraguan films
1990s short documentary films
Documentary films about earthquakes
Films directed by Anne Aghion
Managua
Documentary films about war